Çaykənd or Chaykend or Chaikend or Ch’ayk’end may refer to:
Dprabak, Armenia
Getik, Vayots Dzor, Armenia
Getishen, Armenia
Çaykənd, Dashkasan, Azerbaijan
Çaykənd, Goygol, Azerbaijan
Çaykənd, Kalbajar, Azerbaijan
Çaykənd, Shaki, Azerbaijan
Çaykənd, Shusha, Azerbaijan
Yuxarı Çaykənd, Azerbaijan